Private dancer may refer to:

 Private Dancer, a 1984 album by Tina Turner
 "Private Dancer" (Tina Turner song), a song on the album Private Dancer by Tina Turner
 "Private Dancer" (Danny Fernandes song), a 2008 song
 A dancer who performs a striptease
 A taxi dancer